Hello Madras Girl is a 1983 Indian Malayalam-language film produced, directed and filmed by J. Williams and written by K. Balakrishnan from a story by Williams. It stars Shankar, Mohanlal, Rajkumar Sethupathi, Madhavi, and Poornima Jayaram. The character of Bheeman Raghu resembles that of actor Jayan. The film features music composed by Gangai Amaran.

Cast
Shankar
Madhavi
Mohanlal as Lal
Rajkumar Sethupathi
Kaviyoor Ponnamma
Poornima Jayaram
Kuthiravattam Pappu
Priyadarshan as Man in restaurant
Urvashi

Soundtrack
The music was composed by Gangai Amaran and the lyrics were written by Poovachal Khader.

References

External links
 

1983 films
1980s Malayalam-language films
1983 action films
Films scored by Gangai Amaran
Indian action films